Henryk Grotowski (born 9 March 1949) is a Polish field hockey player. He competed in the men's tournament at the 1972 Summer Olympics.

References

External links
 

1949 births
Living people
Polish male field hockey players
Olympic field hockey players of Poland
Field hockey players at the 1972 Summer Olympics
People from Gniezno